The rhombic dodecahedral honeycomb (also dodecahedrille) is a space-filling tessellation (or honeycomb) in Euclidean 3-space.  It is the Voronoi diagram of the face-centered cubic sphere-packing, which has the densest possible packing of equal spheres in ordinary space (see Kepler conjecture).

Geometry
It consists of copies of a single cell, the rhombic dodecahedron.  All faces are rhombi, with diagonals in the ratio 1:.  Three cells meet at each edge.  The honeycomb is thus cell-transitive, face-transitive, and edge-transitive; but it is not vertex-transitive, as it has two kinds of vertex.  The vertices with the obtuse rhombic face angles have 4 cells.  The vertices with the acute rhombic face angles have 6 cells.

The rhombic dodecahedron can be twisted on one of its hexagonal cross-sections to form a trapezo-rhombic dodecahedron, which is the cell of a somewhat similar tessellation, the Voronoi diagram of hexagonal close-packing.

Colorings 
Cells can be given 4 colors in square layers of 2-colors where neighboring cells have different colors, and 6 colors in hexagonal layers of 3 colors where same-colored cells have no contact at all.

Related honeycombs
The rhombic dodecahedral honeycomb can be dissected into a trigonal trapezohedral honeycomb with each rhombic dodecahedron dissected into 4 trigonal trapezohedrons. Each rhombic dodecahedra can also be dissected with a center point into 12 rhombic pyramids of the rhombic pyramidal honeycomb.

Trapezo-rhombic dodecahedral honeycomb

The trapezo-rhombic dodecahedral honeycomb is a space-filling tessellation (or honeycomb) in Euclidean 3-space. It consists of copies of a single cell, the trapezo-rhombic dodecahedron.  It is similar to the higher symmetric rhombic dodecahedral honeycomb which has all 12 faces as rhombi.

Related honeycombs
It is a dual to the vertex-transitive gyrated tetrahedral-octahedral honeycomb.

Rhombic pyramidal honeycomb 

The rhombic pyramidal honeycomb or half oblate octahedrille is a uniform space-filling tessellation (or honeycomb) in Euclidean 3-space. 

This honeycomb can be seen as a rhombic dodecahedral honeycomb, with the rhombic dodecahedra dissected with its center into 12 rhombic pyramids.

Related honeycombs
It is dual to the cantic cubic honeycomb:

See also
Architectonic and catoptric tessellation

References

External links 

 
 Examples of Housing Construction using this geometry

Honeycombs (geometry)